Cross Currents is a 1916 American silent film starring Helen Ware.

Plot

Ware portrays a young socialite, Elizabeth Crane, who realizes her fiancé, Paul Beale, has a greater love for another woman, Flavia, and steps aside so he may marry. Later they are isolated on a deserted island and rekindle their love.

Cast 
 Helen Ware as Elizabeth Crane, a young socialite
 Courtenay Foote as Paul Beale, Elizabeth's fiancé
 Teddy Sampson as Flavia, Elizabeth's foster sister, and Paul's eventual wife
 Sam De Grasse as millionnaire Sila Randolph, who wishes to marry Elizabeth
 Vera Lewis as Mrs. Van de Meer

Reception 

Louis Reeves Harrison of The Moving Picture World characterized the film as "admirably typed and handled," and noted Ware's performance, "The story carries her from the stilted posturing of the drawing room to the free expression of her intelligence in an extremely difficult performance."

On the other hand, Hazel Simpson Naylor of Motion Picture Magazine found the film "singularly lacking in feminine beauty."

References

External links 

 
 
 

1916 drama films

1916 films
Silent American drama films
Films directed by Francis J. Grandon